The Baitus Sami mosque (literally, 'house of the hearer') is located in the German city of Hanover, Germany. It has both a dome and minaret, although the minaret is too slender to be climbed. Situated at a street in an industrial area outside a nearby residential area, it was inaugurated in August 2008 by the Caliph of the community, Mirza Masroor Ahmad. The construction of the mosque was opposed by many local people, with sometimes violent protests.

See also 

 Islam in Germany
 List of mosques in Europe

References

External links 

Ahmadiyya mosques in Germany
Buildings and structures in Hanover
Mosques completed in 2008